Fun & Games is the third album by the American pop/rock band The Connells, released in 1989. It was recorded primarily at Fort Apache Studios, in Cambridge, MA, with additional recording at Studio 900 in New York City and Reflection Studio in Charlotte, NC.  In the US, the album reached #163 on the Billboard 200 while the single "Something to Say" reached #7 on the Hot Modern Rock Tracks chart.

Track listing
"Something To Say" (Mike Connell) - 3:40
"Fun & Games" (Connell, Doug MacMillan) - 3:06
"Sal" (George Huntley, Mike Ayers, Peele Wimberley) - 3:44
"Upside Down" (Connell) - 3:16
"Fine Tuning" (Connell) - 3:19
"Motel" (Huntley) - 3:40
"Hey Wow" (Connell) - 4:17
"Ten Pins" (Connell, Huntley, MacMillan) - 4:06
"Inside My Head" (Huntley) - 3:12
"Uninspired" (Connell, MacMillan) - 4:10
"Sat Nite (USA)"  (The Connells) - 3:47
"Lay Me Down" (Huntley) - 5:03

"Fine Tuning" was a CD only bonus track.

Personnel 
The Connells
Doug MacMillan - lead vocals
Mike Connell - guitar, slide guitar
George Huntley - guitar, backing vocals; lead vocals on "Sal", "Motel", "Ten Pins", "Inside my Head" and "Lay me Down"
David Connell - bass, percussion
Peele Wimberley - drums, percussion

Additional personnel
Willa Bassen - French horn sampler
Deborah Coffman - cello
Steve Haigler - bells
Jeb Bishop - trombone
Tom Gordon - saxophone
Jon Thornton - trumpet
Tanya Quick - "la la la's"
Gary Smith - producer, piano, organ, guitar, slide guitar, vibes, backing vocals, "la la la's"
Anthony Battaglia - producer, guitar, backing vocals
Matt Matthews - producer
Beth Cumber - illustration, design

References

The Connells albums
1989 albums
Albums produced by Gary Smith (record producer)
TVT Records albums